The Henderson reed warbler (Acrocephalus taiti), also known as the Henderson reed-warbler or the Henderson Island reed warbler, is a species of Old World warbler in the family Acrocephalidae.  It is found only on Henderson Island, part of the Pitcairn Islands.  Its natural habitat is subtropical or tropical dry forests.  It is threatened by habitat loss.

References 

Henderson reed warbler
Birds of Henderson Island
Henderson reed warbler
Taxonomy articles created by Polbot